Cheshmeh Deraz (also Romanized as Cheshmeh Derāz and Chashmeh Derāz; also known as Kāni Darāz and Kānī Derāz) is a village in Yeylan-e Shomali Rural District, in the Central District of Dehgolan County, Kurdistan Province, Iran. At the 2006 census, its population was 134, in 28 families. The village is populated by Kurds.

References 

Towns and villages in Dehgolan County
Kurdish settlements in Kurdistan Province